PBS NewsHour is an American evening television news program broadcast on over 350 PBS member stations. It airs seven nights a week, and is known for its in-depth coverage of issues and current events.

Anchored by Amna Nawaz and Geoff Bennett, the program's weekday broadcasts run for one hour and are produced by WETA-TV in Washington, D.C.  On Saturdays and Sundays, PBS distributes a 30-minute edition of the program, PBS News Weekend, anchored by John Yang; originally produced in New York City by WNET, production of the weekend broadcasts transferred to WETA in April 2022.

The PBS NewsHour originates from WETA's studio facilities in Arlington County, Virginia; news updates inserted into the weekday broadcasts targeted for the Western United States, online, and late-night viewers originate from the Walter Cronkite School of Journalism and Mass Communication at Arizona State University. Additional production facilities for the program are based in San Francisco and Denver. The program is a collaboration between WETA-TV, WNET, and fellow PBS member stations KQED in San Francisco, KETC in St. Louis and WTTW in Chicago.

History

Ownership 
In September 1981, production of the program was taken over by MacNeil/Lehrer Productions, a partnership between Robert MacNeil, Jim Lehrer, and Gannett; the latter sold its stake in the production company in 1986. John C. Malone's Liberty Media bought a 67% controlling equity stake in MacNeil/Lehrer Productions in 1994, but MacNeil and Lehrer retained editorial control. In 2014, MacNeil/Lehrer Productions, owned by MacNeil, Lehrer, and Liberty Media announced its donation, as NewsHour Productions LLC, to WETA-TV as a nonprofit subsidiary.

The Robert MacNeil Report and The MacNeil/Lehrer Report (1975–1983)

In 1973, Robert MacNeil (a former NBC News correspondent and then-moderator of PBS's Washington Week in Review) and Jim Lehrer teamed up to cover the United States Senate's Watergate hearings for PBS. They earned an Emmy Award for their unprecedented gavel-to-gavel coverage.

This recognition led to the creation of The Robert MacNeil Report, a half-hour local news program on WNET, which debuted on October 20, 1975; each episode of the program covered a single issue in depth. On December 1, 1975, the program began to air on PBS stations nationwide. It was renamed The MacNeil/Lehrer Report on September 6, 1976. Most editions employed a two-anchor, two-city format, with MacNeil based in New York City and Lehrer at WETA's studios in Arlington, Virginia. Charlayne Hunter-Gault joined the series as correspondent in 1978, serving as substitute host for MacNeil and Lehrer whenever either had the night off. She became the series’ national correspondent in 1983.

The MacNeil/Lehrer NewsHour and The NewsHour With Jim Lehrer (1983–2009)
Having decided to start competing with the nightly news programs on ABC, CBS and NBC instead of complementing them, the program expanded to one hour on September 5, 1983, incorporating other changes, such as the introduction of "documentary reportage from the field"; it became known at that time as The MacNeil/Lehrer NewsHour. Lester Crystal was its founding executive producer. MacNeil/Lehrer Productions twice planned to launch late-night newscasts in 1995 and 1999; in both instances, the proposed expansions—which, respectively, were to have involved production and newsgathering partnerships with Wall Street Journal Television and The New York Times—were canceled mid-development.

MacNeil retired from the program on October 20, 1995, leaving Lehrer as the sole anchor. (Hunter-Gault left in June 1997.) Accordingly, the program was renamed The NewsHour with Jim Lehrer on October 23. On January 16, 1996, The NewsHour announced the creation of its official website at PBS Online. The NewsHour won a Peabody Award in 2003 for the feature report Jobless Recovery: Non-Working Numbers. On May 17, 1999, The NewsHour adopted a new graphics package, but refreshed the music from 1983. On October 4, 1999, Gwen Ifill joined The NewsHour team as a new correspondent. She was a female anchor of a national nightly news program on broadcast television. Effective January 17, 2000, The NewsHour added "America Online Keyword: PBS" to its ending screen for a three-year agreement through April 22, 2003. For only the website, the program took effect on April 23, 2003. On March 3, 2003, the program added dates from the 1999 graphics in the beginning. On November 17, 2003, The NewsHour added music in the beginning with dates.

On May 17, 2006, the program underwent its first major change in presentation in years, adopting a new graphics package and a reorchestrated version of its theme music (originally composed by Bernard Hoffer). On December 17, 2007, the NewsHour became the second nightly broadcast network newscast to begin broadcasting in high definition (after NBC Nightly News on March 26, 2007), with broadcasts in a letterboxed format for viewers with standard-definition television sets watching via either cable or satellite television. The program also introduced a new set and converted its graphics package to HD.

PBS NewsHour

Departure of Jim Lehrer and switch to co-anchors (2009–2013)

On May 11, 2009, PBS announced that the program would be revamped on December 7 of that year under a revised title, the PBS NewsHour. In addition to increased integration between the NewsHour website and nightly broadcast, the updated production returned to a two-anchor format. Lehrer described the overhaul as the first phase in his move toward retirement.

On September 27, 2010, PBS NewsHour was presented with the Chairman's Award at the 31st News & Documentary Emmy Awards, with MacNeil, Lehrer, Crystal, and former executive producer Linda Winslow receiving the award on the show's behalf.

Lehrer formally ended his tenure as a regular anchor of the program on June 6, 2011. He continued to occasionally anchor on Fridays, when he usually led the political analysis segment with Mark Shields and David Brooks, until December 30, 2011.

Transfer of production, expansion to weekends and the west (2013–present)

On August 6, 2013, Gwen Ifill and Judy Woodruff were named co-anchors and co-managing editors of the NewsHour. They shared anchor duties on the Monday through Thursday editions, with Woodruff anchoring solo on Fridays due to Ifill's duties as host of the political discussion program Washington Week, which was also produced Friday evenings.

For much of its history, the PBS NewsHour aired only Monday through Friday, but in March 2013, plans to expand the program to include Saturday and Sunday editions were under development. Weekend editions of the NewsHour premiered on September 7, 2013, with Hari Sreenivasan serving as anchor. Although they aired for a half-hour, the weekend broadcasts were branded PBS NewsHour Weekend for the duration of WNET’s involvement with the program. From the weekend broadcasts' debut until the March 27, 2022 edition, the Saturday and Sunday editions originated from the Tisch/WNET Studios at Lincoln Center in Manhattan, as opposed to the program's main production facilities at the Arlington, Virginia, studios of WETA-TV.

MacNeil/Lehrer Productions announced in a letter to the show's staffers on October 8, 2013, that it had offered to transfer ownership in the PBS NewsHour to WETA. In the letter, Lehrer and MacNeil cited their reduced involvement with the program's production since their departures from anchoring, as well as "the probability of increasing our fundraising abilities." WETA's board of trustees approved the transfer on June 17, 2014, and it took effect on July 1. At that time, NewsHour Productions, LLC, a wholly owned subsidiary of WETA, took over production of the program. WETA also acquired MacNeil/Lehrer Productions' archives, documentaries, and projects, though not the company's name. PBS NewsHour Weekend was not affected by the ownership transfer and continued to be produced by WNET.

On July 20, 2015, the PBS NewsHour introduced an overhauled visual appearance for its weekday broadcasts, debuting a new minimalist set designed by Eric Siegel and George Allison that heavily incorporates PBS's longtime "Everyman" logo. The program also introduced a new graphics package by Troika Design Group and original theme music by Edd Kalehoff, which incorporates a reorchestration of the nine-note "Question and Answer" musical signature that has been featured in the program's theme since its premiere in 1975 and a musical signature originally incorporated into the Kalehoff-composed theme for the Nightly Business Report used from 2002 to 2010. PBS NewsHour Weekend retained its original graphics package and the theme music by David Cebert until August 29, 2015, when it transitioned to the same theme music and a reworked version of the graphics package used for the weekday broadcasts.

Ifill took brief breaks from her NewsHour anchor duties in the late spring and in November 2016 (and was also absent from the program's presidential election coverage on November 8), as she had been undergoing treatment for advanced stage breast and endometrial cancer. After her death was announced on November 14, 2016, that evening's edition of the PBS NewsHour was dedicated to Ifill and her influence on journalism, featuring tributes from Woodruff, Sreenivasan, former colleagues and program contributors (news content was relegated to the standard news summary, which aired during the second half-hour). Although the program initially featured guest anchors on some editions between January and March 2017, Woodruff went on to become sole anchor. 

In 2018, The Plastic Problem aired, which then went on to win a Peabody Award, presented at the 2019 awards ceremony.

On October 14, 2019, PBS NewsHour launched "PBS NewsHour West", a Western United States bureau at Arizona State University's Walter Cronkite School of Journalism and Mass Communication in Phoenix. Anchored by Stephanie Sy, the bureau produces its own news summary with up-to-date information on events that develop after the original broadcast. A version of the program with this summary is shown to viewers in the Western United States and to online and East Coast viewers watching re-broadcasts.

On April 2, 2022, WETA assumed production responsibilities for the NewsHours Saturday and Sunday editions, which concurrently began originating from the studio at the station’s Washington facility used for the weekday broadcasts. The broadcasts were retitled PBS News Weekend, omitting "NewsHour" in view of their shorter duration. NewsHour Productions transferred production of the weekend broadcasts from WNET in a move to streamline the program's production and news-gathering resources, allowing the weekday and weekend NewsHour broadcasts to have the same pool of correspondents and to share resources with Washington Week (which is also produced by WETA-TV). Coinciding with the move, the weekend editions began carrying feature segments covering culture and the arts. Sreenivasan (who remains a New York-based correspondent for the weekday broadcasts and serves as a contributor for the PBS news discussion program Amanpour & Company) was replaced as weekend anchor by NBC News and MSNBC correspondent Geoff Bennett. As of December 31, 2022, John Yang anchors the weekend program. 

On May 13, 2022, Woodruff announced to NewsHour staffers that she would step down as anchor at the end of the year, though she intends to continue reporting longer pieces for the program while doing projects and specials for WETA through the 2024 United States presidential election at the earliest. Amna Nawaz and Geoff Bennett were named Woodruff's successors. Woodruff made her final broadcast as anchor on December 30, 2022. Nawaz and Bennett anchored their first broadcast as co-anchors on January 2, 2023.

Production and ratings

The program is notable for being shown on public television. There are no interruptions for advertisements (though like most public television programs, there are "corporate image" advertisements at the beginning and end of each broadcast, as well as barker interruptions asking viewers to donate to their local PBS member station or member network during locally produced pledge drives, which are replaced by encore presentations of a select story segment from the past year for stations that not holding a drive during that time).

The program has a more deliberate pace than the news broadcasts of the commercial networks it competes against, allowing for deeper detail in its story packages and feature segments. At the start of the program, the lead story is covered in depth, followed by a news summary that lasts roughly between six and eight minutes, briefly explaining many of the top national and international news headlines; international stories often include excerpts of reports filed by ITN correspondents. This is usually followed by three or four longer news segments, typically running six to twelve minutes, which explore a few of the events mentioned in the headline segment in depth and include discussions with experts, newsmakers, and/or commentators. The program formerly included a reflective essay on a regular basis, but these have been curtailed in recent years; since Woodruff and Ifill became anchors, these essays have mainly aired as part of the end-of-show segment "Brief, but Spectacular".

On Fridays, the program features political analysis and discussion between two regular contributors, one from each of the Republican and Democratic parties, and one host from among the senior correspondents. Since January 2021, the usual participants have been Washington Post columnist Jonathan Capehart and The New York Times columnist David Brooks. Analysts who fill in when Capehart or Brooks are absent have included David Gergen, Thomas Oliphant, Rich Lowry, William Kristol, Ramesh Ponnuru, Ruth Marcus, Michael Gerson, David Corn and E. J. Dionne. On Mondays, a similar segment, "Politics Monday", features analysis and discussion of political issues with contributors Amy Walter, national editor of The Cook Political Report, and Tamara Keith, Washington, D.C. correspondent for NPR.

The program's senior correspondents are Woodruff and Jeffrey Brown (Arts, Culture & Society). Essayists have included Anne Taylor Fleming, Richard Rodriguez, Clarence Page and Roger Rosenblatt. Correspondents have been Tom Bearden, Betty Ann Bowser, Susan Dentzer, Elizabeth Farnsworth, Kwame Holman, Spencer Michels, Fred de Sam Lazaro, the economics correspondent Paul Solman (Making Sen$e), Malcolm Brabant and others.

Lehrer and Ifill were frequent moderators of U.S. political debates. By November 2008, Lehrer had moderated more than ten debates between major U.S. presidential candidates. In 2008, Ifill moderated a debate between U.S. vice presidential candidates Joe Biden and Sarah Palin; in 2004, she moderated a debate between candidates Dick Cheney and John Edwards.

Honor Roll segment 
On March 31, 2003, after the U.S.–led invasion of Iraq in 2003, the PBS NewsHour began what it called its "Honor Roll", a short segment displaying in silence the picture, name, rank, and hometown of U.S. military personnel killed in Iraq. On January 4, 2006, military personnel killed in Afghanistan were added to the segment. According to Nielsen ratings at the program's website, 2.7 million people watch the program each night, and 8 million watch in the course of a week. PBS NewsHour aired the final honor roll segment on August 30, 2021, after the end of War in Afghanistan.

Availability
The PBS NewsHour is broadcast on more than 350 PBS member stations and member networks, making it available to 99% of the viewing public, and audio from the program is broadcast by some NPR radio stations. It is also rebroadcast twice daily in late night via American Public Television's World digital subchannel service. Broadcasts of the PBS NewsHour are also made available worldwide via satellites operated by various agencies such as the Voice of America.

A limited number of PBS member stations and regional member networks do not clear the PBS NewsHour on their schedules due to existing carriage on a "primary" PBS member station, a pool mainly confined to "secondary" stations (most of which participate in the service's Program Differentiation Plan) that share certain media markets with a "primary" member outlet. These include the NJ PBS network in New Jersey (as WNET, which co-manages NJ PBS and WLIW, carries the program in the New York City area, the latter airing the program live, while WHYY-TV does so in the Philadelphia market); KVCR-DT in San Bernardino, California; KCET in Los Angeles (KOCE-TV in Huntington Beach, which shares ownership with KCET through parent Public Media Group of Southern California and is the primary PBS member in the region, serves as the program's carrier in the Los Angeles market); and WYIN in Gary, Indiana (WTTW, the primary PBS station for the Chicago DMA that includes WYIN's Northwest Indiana service area, serves as the program's carrier in the Chicago market). In Boston, WGBH-TV airs the program live each weeknight (with a simulcast online), while its secondary station WGBX rebroadcasts the weekday editions later the same evening, and the weekend editions live; a similar case exists in New York City but in reverse, where WLIW airs the weekday and weekend editions of the PBS NewsHour live while WNET airs them on a tape delay (delayed by one hour on weekday editions and by a half-hour on weekends). KQED in San Francisco airs the program each weeknight in simulcast with its radio sister at 3:00 p.m. Pacific Time (6:00 p.m. Eastern Time), in addition to airing the Western Edition on television at 6:00 p.m. PT. Unusually for many years, the secondary station of Milwaukee PBS, WMVT, carried the program as part of an early-evening news block with the Nightly Business Report (which was the lead-in to NewsHour on many member stations until that program ceased production in December 2019), and half-hour international newscasts from Deutsche Welle and BBC World News, due to an expanded schedule of PBS Kids and local-interest programming on WMVS; this has since been rectified with the launch of the all-hours PBS Kids subchannel network.

Archives of shows broadcast after February 7, 2000, are available in several streaming media formats (including full-motion video) at the program's website. The show is available to overseas military personnel on the American Forces Network. Audio from select segments is also released in podcast form, available through several feeds on the PBS NewsHour's subscriptions page with link to a FeedBurner website (for free mp3 download) and through podcast services such as Apple Podcasts, Google Podcasts, Spotify, and among others.

Livestreaming
The PBS NewsHour is streamed live on the program's YouTube channel at 6:00 p.m. Eastern Time each weeknight, with the Western edition also streaming live at 9:00 p.m. ET (6:00 p.m. Pacific Time). PBS News Weekend is also streamed on the YouTube channel live Saturdays and Sundays at 5:00 p.m. ET. Full episodes are available later on the PBS NewsHour YouTube channel and on the program's dedicated page on PBS's website.

The NewsHour was also livestreamed on Ustream until IBM Watson Media discontinued free livesteraming on the platform on September 17, 2018. The NewsHour has also provided livestreaming of special events, most notably streaming the January 2017 inauguration of Donald Trump on the program's Twitter account.

International broadcasts
 In the United Kingdom it is seen daily at 6am on ABN TV on the Sky platform.
 In Australia the program is seen Tuesdays through Saturdays at 1:00 p.m. AEST on SBS.
 In New Zealand the NewsHour is seen Tuesdays through Saturdays at 10 p.m. on Face TV (Auckland).
 In Japan the program is seen every weekday on NHK BS1.
 Around the world for members of the United States Armed Forces on the American Forces Network.
 The program is seen internationally through the Voice of America.

PBS NewsHour editorial guidelines
On December 4, 2009, when introducing the new PBS NewsHour format, Lehrer read a list of guidelines for what he called "MacNeil/Lehrer journalism":
 "Do nothing I cannot defend."
 "Cover, write, and present every story with the care I would want if the story were about me."
 "Assume there is at least one other side or version to every story."
 "Assume the viewer is as smart and as caring and as good a person as I am."
 "Assume the same about all people on whom I report."
 "Assume personal lives are a private matter until a legitimate turn in the story absolutely mandates otherwise."
 "Carefully separate opinion and analysis from straight news stories, and clearly label everything."
 "Do not use anonymous sources or blind quotes except on rare and monumental occasions."
 "No one should ever be allowed to attack another anonymously."
 "And finally, I am not in the entertainment business."

On-air staff

Current 
Amna Nawaz – co-anchor (joined April 6, 2018, as a chief correspondent and White House correspondent on Fridays; promoted to co-anchor on January 2, 2023)
Geoff Bennett – co-anchor (joined January 3, 2022, as chief Washington correspondent and weekend editions on April 2, 2022; promoted to co-anchor on January 2, 2023)
Jeffrey Brown – chief correspondent for arts, culture, and society, substitute weekday anchor (joined December 23, 1998)
John Yang – national correspondent, weekend anchor (joined March 1, 2016, took over for Bennett as weekend anchor on December 31, 2022)
Miles O'Brien – science and aviation correspondent, substitute anchor (joined February 9, 2010)
Lisa Desjardins – political correspondent (joined October 29, 2014)
William Brangham – regular interviewer and occasional substitute anchor for the weekday and weekend program (joined August 10, 2012)
Laura Barrón-López – White House correspondent (joined on June 16, 2022)
Michael Hill – substitute weekend anchor (joined in September 2020)
Nick Schifrin – foreign affairs and defense correspondent and substitute anchor (joined February 10, 2016)
Paul Solman – business, economics and occasional art correspondent, creator of Making Sen$e (joined September 1, 1978)
Malcolm Brabant – special correspondent, especially reporting from Europe, based in Denmark (joined June 15, 2015)
Alison Stewart – substitute weekend anchor (joined September 27, 2013)
Megan Thompson – substitute weekend anchor (joined January 11, 2013)
Mike Taibbi – special weekend correspondent (joined April 11, 2015)
P.J. Tobia – foreign affairs editor (joined June 19, 2013)
Fred de Sam Lazaro – correspondent and contributor to the Agents For Change series (joined December 10, 1985)
Stephanie Sy – correspondent and PBS NewsHour West anchor (joined October 14, 2019)
Daniel Bush – senior digital political reporter on air during election night coverage (joined November 2015)
 Hari Sreenivasan – special correspondent and former substitute anchor and weekend anchor (December 7, 2009 – March 27, 2022)
Judy Woodruff – senior correspondent and former weekday anchor (joined September 5, 1983 – June 24, 1993; joined CNN Group and returned to PBS on April 12, 2006; stepped down as main anchor on December 30, 2022)

Political analysts
 David Brooks of The New York Times (Fridays; joined September 21, 2001)
 Jonathan Capehart of The Washington Post (Fridays; joined January 8, 2021)
 Tamara Keith of NPR (Mondays; joined November 1, 2012)
 Amy Walter of The Cook Political Report (Mondays and election night; joined July 29, 2004)
 Jeff Greenfield (weekends)
 E. J. Dionne of The Washington Post (substitute)
 Susan Page of USA Today (substitute; joined July 16, 2018)
 Stuart Rothenberg of Inside Elections (substitute; joined October 30, 1992)
 Gary Abernathy of The Washington Post (substitute)

Former 
Robert MacNeil – weekday anchor (October 20, 1975 – October 20, 1995; retired)
Jim Lehrer – weekday anchor and executive editor (March 15, 1976 – June 6, 2011; retired except on Fridays until his last day December 30, 2011, and his last day as an executive editor on September 26, 2014; died on January 23, 2020)
Charlayne Hunter-Gault – weekday anchor (December 8, 1977 – June 13, 1997; retired)
Kwame Holman – correspondent (1983 – 2014; retired)
Roger Mudd – essayist and political correspondent (1987 – 1993; later became primary anchor for The History Channel; died on March 9, 2021)
Margaret Warner – weekday anchor (June 24, 1993 – September 7, 2017; now a White House correspondent after leaving NewsHour)
Gwen Ifill – Monday-Thursday anchor (also a Senior Correspondent) (October 4, 1999 – November 14, 2016; died from endometrial cancer)
Ray Suarez – weekday anchor (October 4, 1999 – October 25, 2013; moved to Al Jazeera America, and left NewsHour after the launch of 2013's NewsHour with Gwen Ifill and Judy Woodruff)
Terence Smith – weekday anchor (August 17, 1998 – November 23, 2005; retired)
Yamiche Alcindor – White House correspondent (December 31, 2015 – January 7, 2022; moved to NBC News)

Political analysts 
 David Gergen (Fridays; March 30, 1981 – March 18, 1994)
 Michael Gerson of The Washington Post (substitute)
 Paul Gigot (Fridays; March 25, 1994 – September 14, 2001)
 Mark Shields as a syndicated columnist (Fridays; November 11, 1988 – December 18, 2020; died on June 18, 2022, from kidney failure)

Criticism and reception 
In 1992, radio broadcaster David Barsamian called the NewsHour "stenographers to power", accusing them and other news media of having a pro-establishment bias.

Critical response 
PBS NewsHour has received generally positive reviews from television critics and parents of young children. Patrick Kevin Day of the Los Angeles Times wrote, "Gwen Ifill and Judy Woodruff are making history on PBS." David Leonard and Micah Schwalb of The Denver Post wrote, "One of the most trusted news programs on television." Phil Owen of TheWrap wrote, "The least partisan analysis." Tim Surette of TV Guide wrote, "The calm and credible information we need."

In 2003, UCLA political scientist Tim Groseclose and Missouri economist Jeff Milyo evaluated various media programs based on "think tank" citations to map liberal versus conservative media slants and published a study alleging liberal media bias in general. Based on their research, PBS NewsHour is the most centrist news program on television and the closest to a truly objective stance. However, their methodology has been questioned.

FAIR study
In October 2006 the media criticism group Fairness and Accuracy in Reporting (FAIR) accused the PBS NewsHour of lacking balance, diversity, and viewpoints of the general public, and for presenting corporate viewpoints. FAIR found that the PBS NewsHours guest list from October 2005 to March 2006 had Republicans outnumbering Democrats 2–1, and minorities accounting for 15 percent of U.S.-based sources. FAIR also protested in 1995 when Liberty Media purchased a majority of the program, citing Liberty's majority owner, John Malone, for his "Machiavellian business tactics" and right-wing sentiments.

NewsHour executive producer Linda Winslow responded to many aspects:

She also accused FAIR of counting sound bites as interviews, thereby skewing their numbers toward the political party holding a majority (at the time of FAIR's report, Republican Party).

Partnership with NPR
The PBS NewsHour partnered with NPR for the broadcast of the Republican and Democratic National Conventions of 2016, in a strategy to prepare for the election between Donald Trump and Hillary Clinton.

References

External links

"PBS NewsHour" Special Collection. American Archive of Public Broadcasting. Retrieved July 23, 2020.

1975 American television series debuts
1980s American television news shows
1990s American television news shows
2000s American television news shows
2010s American television news shows
2020s American television news shows
Flagship evening news shows
ITN
NewsHour
Peabody Award-winning television programs
Television series by WNET
English-language television shows
Television news in the United States